Evan Fraser may refer to:

 Evan Fraser of Balconie, namesake of the town Evanton
 Evan Eugene Fraser (1865–1949), Ontario contractor and political figure